Night Rocker is the debut studio album by the American actor David Hasselhoff. It was released in January 1985 on Silver Blue Records, produced by record producer Joel Diamond.

The album features three duets with Catherine Hickland: "Our First Night Together", "No Way to Be in Love" and "Let It Be Me"; all three songs were featured in the Knight Rider episode "Let It Be Me".

The album reached number one in Austria and was certified Platinum. It also reached the top 30 in Germany.

Cover artwork
On the album's front cover, Hasselhoff poses on top of the hood of a black third-generation Pontiac Firebird (the same car used as KITT in the original Knight Rider series in which Hasselhoff starred) and holds a black and white Aria Pro II ZZ.

Track listing

Charts

Weekly charts

Year-end charts

Certifications

References

External links 
Night Rocker on davidhasselhoffonline.com

David Hasselhoff albums
1985 debut albums
Epic Records albums